2. Divisioona (Finnish for 2nd Division) is the fourth highest league of ice hockey in Finland above 3. Divisioona and below Suomi-sarja. The league is divided geographically into six divisions.

2. Divisioona used to be the 3rd highest league in Finland before the introduction of Suomi-sarja.

Teams (2022–23)

2022–23 divisions

Division 1 – South

Division 2 - Tavastia

Division 3 - Central

Division 4 - Savonia-Karelia

Division 5 - Northern

Division 6 - West Coast

References 

Professional ice hockey leagues in Finland